Haripur(Hindko and ) are the main languages of the Haripur District in Hazara, Khyber Pakhtunkhwa in Pakistan, with Swabi and Buner to the west, some  north of Islamabad and 35 km Khanpur Road Tofkian Valley Taxila and  south of Abbottabad. A Store By Ibtasam is also in Haripur.

History 

Haripur was founded by the Sikh general Hari Singh Nalwa in 1822 and became the headquarters of Hazara until 1853. and General Mahan Singh Mirpuri had also credit in its battle.  Hari Singh Nalwa was appointed by Maharaja Ranjit Singh as the second Nazim of Hazara after the first Nazim Amar Singh Majithia was killed by the local populace at Samundar Katha, Abbottabad.

Baron Hugel visited the town on 23 December 1835, and he found it humming with activity. The municipality was constituted in 1867.

An obelisk marks the grave of Colonel Canara, a European officer of the Sikh Artillery, who fell in 1848 defending his guns single-handed against the insurgents under Chattar Singh.

In 1851, the 4th (Hazara) Mountain Battery was raised at Haripur from Hazara gunners, who were trained by James Abbott, a British officer and first deputy commissioner of Hazara, to defend the district. The Hazaras embarked on many campaigns throughout the province.

The population in 1901 was 5,578 and the income and expenditure during the ten years ending 1902–3 averaged Rs. 17,800. In 1903-04 the income and expenditure were Rs. 19,100 and Rs. 20,000 respectively.

Education
Haripur has the University of Haripur and some collages affiliated to this University , and Pak-Austria Fachhochschule Institute of Applied Sciences and Technology,

Climate
The weather in Haripur is characterized by relatively high temperatures and evenly distributed precipitation throughout the year. This climate type is found on the eastern sides of the continents between 20° and 35° N and S latitude.  The Köppen climate classification subtype for this climate is "Cfa" (humid subtropical climate).

Notable personalities
Ayub Khan, former Chief of Army Staff and President of Pakistan
Gohar Ayub Khan, Former Speaker of National Assembly, Foreign Minister and Minister for Water and Power.
Yousaf Ayub Khan, Former MPA.
Akbar Ayub Khan, Former MPA and Education Minister of Haripur.
Umar Ayub Khan, Former MNA and Minister for Water and Power. 
Raja Sikander Zaman, Former Chief Minister, Khyber-Pakhtunkhwa.
Raja Aamer Zaman, Former MNA. 
Raja Faisal Zaman, Former MPA. 
Anwar Shamim, Air Marshal.
Sardar Muhammad Mushtaq Khan, Former Tehsil Nazim MPA & MNA.
Faisal Zaman, member of the Khyber Pakhtunkhwa Assembly
Babar Nawaz Khan Khadim e Haripur, Former MNA.
Gohar Nawaz Khan, Former MPA.
Allama Syed Jawad Naqvi, Renowned Islamic Revolutionary Scholar, religious leader and Quran interpreter.
Qateel Shifai, Urdu Poet, and Lyricist.
Sohail Akhtar, Pakistani cricketer
Pir Sabir Shah Ex Chief Minister KP
Samiullah Khan Mayor Haripur
Saleh Muhammad Khan Dilazak Special appointed person by Mughal Govt to Divide lands among tribes of Hazara
Muhammad Khan Tareen Freedom fighter
Ghulam Khan Tareen Freedom Fighter Martyr

See also
 Hazara, Pakistan
 Haripur District
 Khalabat Township
State of Amb
 Panian

References

 
Haripur District
Cities in Khyber Pakhtunkhwa